Jiuduhe Town is a town on southwestern Huairou District, Beijing, China. It shares border with Yongning and Sihai Towns in its north, Bohai and Qiaozi Towns in its east, Yanshou Town in its south, and Dazhuangke Township in its west. It had a population of 12,533 in 2020.

History

Administrative divisions 
In 2021, Jiuduhe Town was composed of 18 villages:

See also 

 List of township-level divisions of Beijing

References 

Huairou District
Towns in Beijing